Bernard George Davis (December 11, 1906 – August 28, 1972) was an American publishing executive. He and William Bernard Ziff Sr. founded Ziff Davis Inc. in 1927. In 1957, he sold his ownership share of Ziff-Davis to William Ziff Jr., and left to found Davis Publications Inc.

References

External links
"Ziff Davis Corporate Timeline." Ziff Davis. 7 Nov 2006 https://web.archive.org/web/20061215134959/http://www.ziffdavis.com/press/timeline.

American magazine founders
1906 births
1972 deaths
20th-century American businesspeople